Metatrichia bulbosa is a species of window flies in the family Scenopinidae.

References

Scenopinidae
Articles created by Qbugbot
Taxa named by Carl Robert Osten-Sacken
Insects described in 1877